Darren Murphy (born 28 July 1985) is an Irish football manager and former footballer who played as a midfielder. Murphy started his playing career at Cobh Ramblers, progressing through the club's youth system before breaking into the first team during the 2003 season. He then joined Cork City in 2007, and spent two seasons at the club. In December 2008, he joined Stevenage and helped the team win the FA Trophy in his first season there. Murphy was part of the Stevenage team that earned back-to-back promotions from the Conference Premier into League One. He was released by Stevenage when his contract expired in May 2012.

He subsequently joined Port Vale on a free transfer two months later. Murphy signed for Macclesfield Town in January 2013, but returned to Ireland two weeks later after tearing his calf muscle. Injury would disrupt the latter stages of his career, spending time with Woking in September 2013, before returning to Cork City two months later. He rejoined Cobh Ramblers in February 2015 and also played once for Avondale United. Murphy made the transition from playing to coaching, spending time as first-team coach at Cobh Ramblers, before being appointed as the team's under-19 manager in February 2021. After becoming interim manager of the first team in July 2021, Murphy was appointed first-team manager in September 2021 and remained in the post until June 2022.

Early life
Born in Cork, Republic of Ireland, he is a native of Carrignavar. Murphy combined playing football alongside serving his electrical apprenticeship in Cork from 2003 to 2006.

Playing career
Murphy started his career at Irish club Cobh Ramblers, as part of the club's youth system. He made his senior debut for Cobh Ramblers in an FAI Cup match against Shamrock Rovers in August 2002, three weeks after he had turned 17. Murphy suffered a ruptured anterior cruciate ligament during his time with the club, recovering from the injury to play 77 times over five years, scoring nine goals. Murphy signed for Cork City on a two-year contract in February 2007. He played regularly in the first team during the latter stages of the 2007 season, making 32 appearances. Financial issues forced Cork City into examinership in Murphy's second season with the club and he left the club when his contract expired at the end of the 2008 season.

Stevenage
Murphy was offered a one-week trial with English Conference Premier club Stevenage in December 2008, which proved successful, signing for the club on a short-term contract on 16 December 2008. Murphy made his Stevenage debut in a 3–0 victory against Lewes at Broadhall Way. He scored his first goal for the club in a 2–1 win against Kettering Town, scoring from close-range to restore parity in the match. He made 20 appearances for the club during the 2008–09 season, during which he was sent-off twice in matches against Kidderminster Harriers and Cambridge United; the latter was rescinded. This meant that Murphy was able to play in the club's 2–0 FA Trophy Final victory against York City at Wembley Stadium on 9 May 2009, a competition in which he started six games. He played 24 times during the 2009–10 season as Stevenage won promotion to the Football League for the first time in the club's history.

Murphy played his first game of the 2010–11 season on 9 August 2010, starting in Stevenage's 2–1 defeat to Portsmouth in the League Cup, scoring Stevenage's goal with a shot from outside the area that was deflected in. He was substituted at half-time after suffering a dislocated shoulder, and was ruled out of first-team action for a month. Murphy broke his leg whilst playing for Stevenage's reserve team against Colchester United reserves in September 2010. He underwent surgery on the injury and the club stated he would likely miss the remainder of the season. Murphy returned to the first team in the club's 1–0 away victory at Wycombe Wanderers on 12 March 2011, playing the first half of the match. He played nine games during the 2010–11 season, scoring once. This included three appearances in the 2010–11 League Two play-offs following Stevenage's sixth-placed finish. Following a 3–0 aggregate victory over Accrington Stanley, Stevenage earned promotion to League One after a 1–0 victory against Torquay United at Old Trafford on 28 May 2011, with Murphy coming on as a 57th-minute substitute in the match.

After making no first-team appearances during the first half of Stevenage's 2011–12 season due to a "succession of little injuries", Murphy joined League Two club Aldershot Town on a one-month loan agreement on 10 February 2012. He made his debut four days later in Aldershot's 1–0 home victory against Hereford United, Aldershot's first home win since December 2011. He made two further appearances during the loan, and returned to Stevenage in March 2012. Murphy struggled with hamstring, groin and ankle injuries and was not involved in the latter stages of Stevenage's season, making no appearances for the team during the season. He was released by Stevenage when his contract expired in May 2012. Murphy made 53 appearances in all competitions during his three years with the club.

Port Vale
Murphy signed for League Two club Port Vale on a free transfer on 2 July 2012, signing a one-year contract. He made his debut from the substitutes' bench on 25 August 2012, replacing Chris Shuker 74 minutes into a 3–1 victory over Morecambe at the Globe Arena. Murphy struggled with hamstring problems whilst the team moved up to second in the league table in his absence. He eventually made his full debut on 20 October 2012, in a 4–1 home victory against Wycombe Wanderers. On making his return to fitness, he speculated that "if there was a hell for footballers that's what you'd do, sit in the stand watching games injured." Murphy made only his third appearance of the season against Rochdale on 6 November 2012, but having entered the game as a substitute he was forced off injured after only a few minutes due to a recurrence of his calf injury. He left the club by mutual consent on 8 January 2013.

Return to Non-League
Having initially planned on returning to Ireland, Murphy received a contract offer from Conference Premier club Macclesfield Town. He accepted the offer on 31 January 2013, signing a contract lasting until the end of the 2012–13 season. Two weeks into his time at Macclesfield, he tore his calf muscle in training and on 13 February 2013, having made no appearances for the club, his contract was cancelled by mutual consent.

He returned to Ireland and trained with former club Cork City. Murphy wanted to resume his playing career in England and spoke to Graham Westley, his former manager at Stevenage, who agreed for him to spend pre-season at the club ahead of the 2013–14 season. He arranged with Westley to "play some games for another club, to regain my confidence and then return to Stevenage". He subsequently signed for Woking of the Conference Premier on 24 September 2013. He made his Woking debut the same day his signing was announced, playing the first 68 minutes in a 4–0 home defeat to Luton Town at Kingfield Stadium. Murphy made three appearances for Woking before injury curtailed his time at the club.

Return to Ireland
Murphy returned to Cork City on a free transfer on 16 November 2013. He made his first appearance back at Cork on 10 March 2014, starting in a 4–0 home victory over Limerick in the League of Ireland Cup. Murphy made five appearances for the club during a season disrupted by injuries as Cork finished the 2014 season in second place in the League of Ireland Premier Division. He dislocated his shoulder in a pre-season friendly against Birmingham City in July 2014 and notified Cork City manager John Caulfield of his decision to retire from playing after the match.

Having recovered from the shoulder injury, Murphy was offered the chance to come out of retirement and rejoin Cobh Ramblers of the League of Ireland First Division in February 2015, which he accepted, making one appearance towards the latter stages of the 2015 season. Murphy remained at Cobh Ramblers for just over two years, making eight first-team appearances during his second spell with the club. He also played once for Avondale United of the Munster Senior League in April 2017, appearing in a 2–0 League of Ireland Cup defeat against his former employers, Cobh Ramblers, on 4 April 2017. Murphy retired from playing and made the transition into coaching.

Coaching career
During his playing career, Murphy combined his playing role alongside acting as a community and academy coach at Stevenage in 2011. He also served as a community coach at Port Vale. He earned his UEFA B Licence in 2017 and was issued his UEFA A Licence in 2019. Murphy was appointed as first-team coach at Cobh Ramblers in January 2015, a position he held until October 2016. He was appointed as manager of the Cobh Ramblers under-19 team in February 2021. He was named as interim manager of the Cobh Ramblers first team until the end of the season on 23 July 2021, following the exit of previous manager Stuart Ashton. He was given the role on a permanent basis on 16 September 2021, signing a contract until the end of the 2023 season. It was announced on 18 June 2022 that Cobh had "amicably agreed to part ways" with Murphy.

Style of play
Murphy was deployed as a midfielder throughout his career. His role in midfield was predominantly as a defensive midfielder, where he was tasked with breaking up opposition play. Murphy described himself as "never the best player", and what he lacked in the technical aspects of the game, he "compensated for" with his work ethic. Described as "an energetic, combative midfielder" and "tough-tackling", Murphy stated that his physical style of play contributed to the number of injuries he sustained during his playing career.

Career statistics

A.  The "Other" column constitutes appearances and goals (including those as a substitute) in the FA Trophy, play-offs and FAI Cup.

Honours
Stevenage
 FA Trophy: 2008–09; runner-up: 2009–10
 Conference Premier: 2009–10
 League Two play-offs: 2010–11

References

External links

 

1985 births
Living people
Association footballers from Cork (city)
Republic of Ireland association footballers
Association football midfielders
Cobh Ramblers F.C. players
Cork City F.C. players
Stevenage F.C. players
Aldershot Town F.C. players
Port Vale F.C. players
Macclesfield Town F.C. players
Woking F.C. players
League of Ireland players
National League (English football) players
English Football League players
Republic of Ireland football managers
Cobh Ramblers F.C. managers
League of Ireland managers